The 2014 Newcastle Knights season was the 27th in the club's history. Coached by Wayne Bennett and captained by Kurt Gidley, they competed in the NRL's 2014 Telstra Premiership, finishing the regular season in 12th place (out of 16).

Milestones
Round 1: Michael Dobson made his debut for the club, after previously playing for the Hull Kingston Rovers.
Round 2: Matt Minto made his NRL debut for the club.
Round 4: Darius Boyd played his 50th game for the club.
Round 6: Adam Clydsdale scored his 1st career try.
Round 6: Tyrone Roberts kicked his 100th goal for the club, which was also his 100th career goal.
Round 7: Jake Mamo made his NRL debut for the club.
Round 7: Korbin Sims scored his 1st career try.
Round 8: Dane Gagai played his 50th career game.
Round 9: Joseph Tapine made his NRL debut for the club.
Round 9: Paterika Vaivai made his NRL debut for the club.
Round 13: Darius Boyd played his 200th career game.
Round 13: Akuila Uate scored his 92nd career try, breaking Timana Tahu's record of 91 tries as the highest ever try-scorer for the Knights.
Round 14: Jake Mamo scored his 1st career try.
Round 14: Willie Mason played his 50th game for the club.
Round 14: Robbie Rochow played his 50th career game.
Round 16: Dane Gagai played his 50th game for the club.
Round 16: Robbie Rochow played his 50th game for the club.
Round 18: Wayne Bennett coached his 700th career game.
Round 20: Dane Gagai kicked his 1st career goal.
Round 20: Chanel Mata'utia made his NRL debut for the club.
Round 20: Sione Mata'utia made his NRL debut for the club.
Round 20: Kade Snowden played his 150th career game.
Round 22: Chris Houston played his 150th career game.
Round 22: Chanel Mata'utia scored his 1st career try.
Round 22: Travis Waddell scored his 1st try for the club.
Round 23: Adam Cuthbertson played his 50th game for the club.
Round 23: Sione Mata'utia scored his 1st career try.
Round 25: Kurt Gidley captained his 100th game for the club.
Round 25: Tyler Randell made his NRL debut for the club.
Round 26: Joseph Leilua played his 100th career game.

Squad

Transfers and Re-signings

Gains

Losses

Promoted juniors

Re-signings

Player contract situations

Ladder

Jerseys and sponsors
In 2014, the Knights' jerseys were made by ISC and their major sponsor was Hunter Ports.

Fixtures

Pre-season trials

Auckland Nines

Squad: 1. Adam Cuthbertson 2. Jake Mamo 3. Dane Gagai 4. Joseph Leilua 5. Akuila Uate 6. Jarrod Mullen (c) 7. Tyrone Roberts 8. Willie Mason 9. Adam Clydsdale 10. Chris Houston 11. Beau Scott 12. Robbie Rochow 13. Jeremy Smith 14. Michael Dobson 15. Alex McKinnon 16. Zane Tetevano

Regular season
2014 Regular season fixtures

Statistics

32 players used.

Source:

Representative honours

The following players appeared in a representative match in 2014.

Australia
Darius Boyd
Kurt Gidley (train-on squad)
Willie Mason (train-on squad)
Sione Mata'utia
Beau Scott

Australian Schoolboys
Jack Cogger
Brock Lamb
Braden Robson

Fiji
Korbin Sims
Rick Stone (coach)

Junior Kangaroos
Jake Mamo
Sione Mata'utia (train-on squad)

Junior Kiwis
Danny Levi
Chance Peni
Pride Petterson-Robati (train-on squad)
Joseph Tapine
James Taylor (train-on squad)

Lebanon
James Elias

New South Wales
James McManus
Beau Scott

New South Wales Country
James McManus
Jarrod Mullen
Tyrone Roberts
Robbie Rochow
Beau Scott (captain)

New South Wales Residents
Chanel Mata'utia
Tyler Randell

New South Wales under-16s
Matt Cooper
Kurtis Dark
Brodie Jones
Brendan O'Hagan
Tom Starling

New South Wales under-18s
Sione Mata'utia

New South Wales under-20s
Jake Mamo
Sione Mata'utia

Prime Minister's XIII
Sione Mata'utia
Beau Scott

Queensland
Darius Boyd

Queensland under-20s
Jaelen Feeney

Samoa
David Fa'alogo (captain)
Joseph Leilua
Chanel Mata'utia (train-on squad)
Sione Mata'utia (train-on squad)

Individual honours

Teams and squads
National Youth Competition (NYC) Team of the Year
Mick Crawley (coach)
Danny Levi
Jake Mamo
Sione Mata'utia
Joseph Tapine

New South Wales Cup Team of the Year
Michael Dobson
Josh Mantellato
Tyler Randell
Nathan Ross

Queensland Academy of Sport Emerging Origin Squad
Dane Gagai
Korbin Sims

Queensland Academy of Sport Under-20s Emerging Origin Squad
Jaelen Feeney

New South Wales Under-20s Origin Pathways Camp
Jake Mamo
Sione Mata'utia

Dally M awards
Dally M Second Rower of the Year
Beau Scott

Newcastle Knights awards

Player of the Year
National Rugby League (NRL) Player of the Year: Beau Scott
New South Wales Cup Player of the Year: Paterika Vaivai
National Youth Competition (NYC) Player of the Year: Sione Mata'utia

Players' Player
National Rugby League (NRL) Players' Player: Kurt Gidley
New South Wales Cup Players' Player: Chad Redman
National Youth Competition (NYC) Players' Player: Luke Yates

Coach's Award
National Rugby League (NRL) Coach's Award: Alex McKinnon & Beau Scott
New South Wales Cup Coach's Award: Tyler Randell
National Youth Competition (NYC) Coach's Award: Lachlan Fitzgibbon

Brian Carlson Club-Andrew Johns Medal
Jack Cogger

References

Newcastle Knights seasons
Newcastle Knights season